Souther may refer to:

 Souther (meteorology), a strong wind coming from the south

People
 J. D. Souther (born 1945), American singer and songwriter
 Richard Souther, American composer and instrumentalist
 John Souther (1816–1911), founder of Globe Locomotive Works
 Michael Souther, Canadian television director, producer and writer
 Calvin Souther Fuller (1902–1994), American physical chemist and co-inventor of the solar cell
 Jack Souther (1924–2014), American-Canadian geologist

Places
 Souther Fell, a mountainous landscape in the English Lake District
 Souther Field, an airport in Americus, Georgia Airport

Other uses
 John Souther House, an historic house in Newton, Massachusetts, United States
 Souther, an antagonist in the manga/anime series Fist of the North Star

See also
 Southers, a military group in the comic strip Rogue Trooper
 Erroll Southers, 2009 nominee to be chief Administrator of the United States Transportation Security Administration